Twelfth Assembly of Tamil Nadu was instituted after the victory of AIADMK and allies, in the 2001 state assembly election. O. Panneerselvam officially became the 13th and J. Jayalalithaa became the 14th Chief Minister of Tamil Nadu due to the election. Even though Jayalalithaa was the Chief Minister between 14 May and 21 September 2001, the Supreme Court of India, declared that she did not legally hold the post, due to corruption charges from her previous Chief ministership.

Overview

Council of Ministers

See also 
Government of Tamil Nadu
Legislature of Tamil Nadu

References

Tamil Nadu Legislative Assembly